Mexico–Trinidad and Tobago relations refers to the diplomatic relations between the United Mexican States and the Republic of Trinidad and Tobago. Both nations are members of the Association of Caribbean States, Community of Latin American and Caribbean States, Organization of American States and the United Nations.

History
Mexico and Trinidad and Tobago are two American nations with an early common history. Initially, both nations had been under control of the Spanish Empire. By 1802, Trinidad and Tobago became part of the British Empire. In 1962, Trinidad and Tobago became an independent nation. On 30 April 1966, Mexico and Trinidad and Tobago established diplomatic relations. In 1982, Mexico opened a resident embassy in Port of Spain, however, in 1985 Mexico closed the embassy due to financial difficulties. The Mexican embassy was re-opened in 1995.

In August 1975, Mexican President Luis Echeverría paid an official visit to Trinidad and Tobago. During his visit he met with Trinidadian Prime Minister Eric Williams. In January 1998, Prime Minister Basdeo Panday paid an official visit to Mexico where he met with Mexican President Ernesto Zedillo. Since the initial visits, there have been a few high-level visits between leaders of both nations. In 2016, both nations celebrated 50 years of diplomatic relations.

High-level visits

Presidential visits from Mexico to Trinidad and Tobago

 President Luis Echeverría (1975)
 President Felipe Calderón (2009)

Prime Ministerial visits from Trinidad and Tobago to Mexico

 Prime Minister Basdeo Panday (1998)
 Prime Minister Patrick Manning (2008, 2010)

Bilateral relations
Both nations have signed several bilateral agreements, such as an Agreement of Scientific, Technological, Educational and Cultural Cooperation (1975); Agreement on the Suppression of Visa Requirements for Diplomatic and Official Passport Holders (1997); Agreement of Cooperation in the Fight against Illicit Traffic, Abuse of Narcotic Drugs and Psychotropic Substances and Related Offenses (1998); Agreement of Academic Cooperation between the Mexican Secretariat of Foreign Affairs and the Ministry of Foreign Affairs of Trinidad and Tobago (1998); Agreement of the Promotion and Reciprocal Protection of Investments (2006); Agreement on the Suppression of Visa Requirements for Ordinary Passport Holders (2008) and a Memorandum of Understanding on Diplomatic Academic Collaboration between the Mexican Secretariat of Foreign Affairs and the University of the West Indies, Saint Augustine campus (2016).

Trade
In 2018, trade between Mexico and Trinidad and Tobago totaled US$420 million. Mexico's main exports to Trinidad and Tobago include: refrigerators; dolomite; malt extract; tubes and hollow profiles; and chemical based products. Trinidad and Tobago main exports to Mexico include: petroleum gas; ammonia and chemical based products. Mexican multinational company Cemex invests and operates in Trinidad and Tobago.

Resident diplomatic missions
 Mexico has an embassy in Port of Spain.
 Trinidad and Tobago is accredited to Mexico from its embassy in Washington, D.C., United States.

References 

 
Trinidad and Tobago
Mexico